Ndut (Ndoute) is a Cangin language of Senegal. Ethnologue reports that it is 84% cognate (and 55% intelligible) with Palor, essentially a divergent dialect, and 68% cognate with the other Cangin languages.

References

Languages of Senegal
Cangin languages